The United States Department of Agriculture allows private insurance companies that participate in the federal crop insurance program to transfer a portion of their risk to the federal government. The standard reinsurance agreement establishes the terms and conditions under which the federal government will provide subsidies and reinsurance on eligible crop insurance contracts sold or reinsured by the insurance company named on the agreement.

See also
Reinsurance

References 

United States Department of Agriculture
Reinsurance